"It's Gonna Rain!" is Bonnie Pink's sixth single from the album Heaven's Kitchen. The single was released under the Pony Canyon label on June 18, 1997. It was used as the fifth ending theme for the anime series Rurouni Kenshin.

Track listing
It's Gonna Rain!

It's Gonna Rain! (Instrumental)

Oricon Sales Chart

References 

1997 singles
1997 songs
Bonnie Pink songs
Pony Canyon singles
Songs written by Bonnie Pink